Maurandya is a genus of flowering plants in the family Plantaginaceae,  native to Mexico and the south west United States (from California to central Texas). They sprawl or climb by means of twining leaf stalks. One of the four species, Maurandya barclayana, is widely cultivated as an ornamental plant.

The generic name is often misspelt as Maurandia. Two of its species have at times been placed in the genera Epixiphium and Maurandella.

Description

The species of Maurandya are either herbaceous perennials with fibrous roots or, in the case of M. wislizeni, an annual with a tap root. All are sprawlers or climbers, climbing by means of twining leaf stalks (petioles). The leaves are shaped like broad or narrow arrowheads, more rarely heart-shaped.

The flower stalks (peduncles) grow upwards and bear solitary flowers. The more-or-less triangular sepals are not joined together but jointly form an urn-shaped structure around the base of the flower. The petals (collectively the corolla) are joined at the base to form a tube with five free lobes at the tip. The lobes are differentiated into two upper ones, usually curving backwards, and three lower ones, usually pointing forwards. The corolla is whitish at the base with various colours further on: pink, red, violet, blue or combinations of these. In M. antirrhiniflora, the flowers have two "lips" partly enclosing the throat or tube of the flower; in the other species, the flower tube is open.

There are four fertile stamens, two of one length and two of another, plus a rudimentary sterile stamen. The stamens and style are included in the flower. After fertilization, a two-valved capsule forms, of various shapes, containing dark brown seeds.

Taxonomy

Maurandya scandens was the first species of the genus to be described for science, by Antonio José Cavanilles in 1793, based on plants being grown in Spain. He named the species Usteria scandens. However, the generic name Usteria had already been used in 1790, so was illegitimate. In 1797, Casimiro Gómez Ortega provided the legitimate generic name, Maurandya. A year later, Nikolaus Joseph von Jacquin published the orthographic variant (i.e. misspelling) Maurandia. The generic name Maurandya honours Catherina Pancratia Maurandy, the wife of a Spanish professor of botany, described by Ortega as the partner (socia) of his botanical labours.

The genus is placed in the tribe Antirrhineae; within this tribe, it is closely related to Lophospermum, Mabrya and Rhodochiton. Both Lophospermum and Rhodochiton have been included in Maurandya as sections; Mabrya was split off from Maurandya by Wayne J. Elisens. Scientific names within these genera have been confused; for example, an image accepted by Tropicos as Lophospermum erubescens bears the caption Maurandya barclaiana (a variant spelling of Maurandya barclayana).

Phylogeny
A number of molecular phylogenetic studies have shown that subtribe Maurandyinae, defined by Elisen to consist of the five North American genera Holmgrenanthe, Lophospermum, Mabrya, Maurandya and Rhodochiton, forms a monophyletic group, which is related to the Old World genera Cymbalaria and Asarina. Gehebrehiwet et al. suggested that the Maurandyinae could be expanded to include Cymbalaria and Asarina. Vargas et al. presented the following cladogram in 2013:

Vargas et al. concluded that the Antirrhineae evolved in the Old World and subsequently colonized North America more than once, probably in the Miocene epoch. One such colonization led to the evolution of the Maurandyinae (in Elisen's sense).

Species

, four species are accepted:
 Maurandya antirrhiniflora Humb. & Bonpl. ex Willd. (syn. Maurandella antirrhiniflora (Humb. & Bonpl. ex Willd.) Rothm.)
 Maurandya barclayana Lindl.
 Maurandya scandens (Cav.) Pers.
 Maurandya wislizeni Engelm. ex A.Gray (syn. Epixiphium wislizeni (Engelm. ex A.Gray) Munz)

The partially closed flowers of M. antirrhiniflora compared to the open flowers of the other species have been a factor in some authorities putting it into a separate genus, Maurandella (or at least into a different section within Maurandya).  Elisens does not consider the differences sufficient to warrant such a move.

M. wislizeni is somewhat different from the other species; for example, it is the only annual growing from a tap root. Some authorities have put it into a separate genus, Epixiphium, or in a separate section within Maurandya. This has been rejected by Elisens in his monograph on the subtribe to which Maurandya belongs, on the grounds that the overall similarities "indicate a close relationship among the four species". He does however place this species in a separate subgenus, M. subgenus Epixiphium, with the other three species in M. subgenus Maurandya.

Formerly placed here

A number of species formerly in Maurandya were put into a new genus, Mabrya, by Elisens and by David A. Sutton:
 Maurandya acerifolia Pennell = Mabrya acerifolia (Pennell) Elisens
 Maurandya coccinea I.M.Johnst. = Mabrya coccinea (I.M.Johnst.) Elisens
 Maurandya erecta Hemsl. = Mabrya erecta (Hemsl.) Elisens
 Maurandya flaviflora I.M.Johnst. = Mabrya flaviflora (I.M.Johnst.) D.A.Sutton
 Maurandya geniculata B.L.Rob. & Fernald  = Mabrya geniculata (B.L.Rob. & Fernald) Elisens
 Maurandya rosei Munz = Mabrya rosei (Munz) Elisens

Other species that have been placed in Maurandya include:
 Maurandya atrosanguinea (Zucc.) G.Nicholson = Rhodochiton atrosanguineus (Zucc.) Rothm.
 Maurandya erubescens (D.Don) A.Gray = Lophospermum erubescens D.Don
 Maurandya juncea Benth. = Gambelia juncea (Benth.) D.A.Sutton
 Maurandya lophospermum L.H.Bailey (syn. M. scandens (D.Don) A.Gray, nom. superfl., not M. scandens (Cav.) Pers.) = Lophospermum scandens D.Don
 Maurandya petrophila Coville & C.V.Morton = Holmgrenanthe petrophila (Coville & C.V.Morton) Elisens
 Maurandya purpusii Brandegee = Lophospermum purpusii (Brandegee) Rothm.

Distribution and habitat

Maurandya species are native to Mexico and the south west United States (from California through Arizona and New Mexico to central Texas). The other three species are somewhat more restricted in habitat. M. wislizeni is an annual found in the Chihuahuan Desert.

Some species of Maurandya have escaped cultivation and become naturalized, including M. antirrhiniflora in Hawaii and Florida.

Ecology

The pollinator of M. wislizeni is unknown, but its flower colour and shape are similar, suggesting it too is pollinated by long-tongued bees. M. scandens has flowers of a similar size and shape, but of a reddish-pink colour, normally associated with pollination by hummingbirds. It may have recently evolved from a bee-pollinated ancestor.

Cultivation

Maurandya barclayana has been cultivated as an ornamental climber since at least the 19th century.  It was introduced into England in 1825 by Mr. Barclay, a London brewer. The Horticultural Society of London named it in honour of Dr. Maurandy, a botanical professor, at Carthegena, and Barclayana, in honour of the man who introduced it to England. Joseph Paxton described its cultivation in 1836, saying that it was a "beautiful climber". Elisens described it as "a particularly attractive hanging or climbing plant". Maurandya scandens is also commonly cultivated and has escaped to grow in the wild. The two species can cross when grown together.

As noted above, Maurandya and Lophospermum species have regularly been confused, particularly in cultivation. Cultivated species of Maurandya have shorter flowers than those of Lophospermum and leaves with entire rather than toothed margins.

Plants may be grown from seed and treated as annuals. In frost-free climates, or where the roots can be protected from frost, plants may be perennial, regrowing from the base after dying back in the winter.

Notes

References

External links
 
 

Plantaginaceae
Plantaginaceae genera
Flora of Mexico
Flora of the Southwestern United States
Flora of California